was a Japanese samurai of the Azuchi-Momoyama period.

He was a tutor of the young Toyotomi Hideyoshi.

References

Samurai
1539 births
1604 deaths